Mima is an unincorporated community in Morgan County, Kentucky. Mima lies at an elevation of 1010 feet (308 m).

References

Unincorporated communities in Kentucky
Unincorporated communities in Morgan County, Kentucky